Human Griefman is the second album released by the Japanese metal band  Aion. It is essentially the same album as Deathrash Bound, however, all of Hisayoshi's vocals have been replaced with Nov's, the lyrics were rewritten and most song titles were changed. Promotional videos of "Think Ever After" and "Amnesia" have been made to promote the band's work. The album was reissued on July 25, 1991, as 'Human Griefman Remastering'.

Track listing

Personnel
Nov – vocals
Izumi – lead and rhythm guitars
Dean – bass guitar
S.A.B – drums

References

1990 albums
Aion (Japanese band) albums